Olympic Athlete from Russia women's national ice hockey team (OAR) is the International Olympic Committee's designation of select Russian athletes permitted to participate in the 2018 Winter Olympics in Pyeongchang, South Korea. The designation is the result of the suspension of the Russian Olympic Committee after the Olympic doping controversy.

Women's tournament

Russia women's national ice hockey team qualified by finishing 4th in the 2016 IIHF World Ranking.
Team roster

Preliminary round

References

Ice hockey at the 2018 Winter Olympics – Women's tournament
ice hockey